Liolaemidae are a family of iguanian lizards. They are traditionally included in the Iguanidae as subfamily Liolaeminae, which some more recent authors prefer to delimit in a more restricted way. A common name for this group is liolaemids. Liolaemidae are typically herbivores, who have a high diet in fruit. Because of this special diet, Liolaemidae have a larger small intestine when compared to other similar omnivorous and insectivorous lizards.

The genera placed here are:
 Ctenoblepharys – cabezona (one species)
 Liolaemus – tree iguanas, snow swifts (over 280 species)
 Phymaturus (52 species)

References 

 
 

 
Lizard families]
Taxa named by Darrel Frost
Taxa named by Richard Emmett Etheridge